Callihoplites is a genus of rather evolute ammonites from the Lower Cretaceous, Late Albian. Its whorl section squarish or compressed, inner whorls bearing umbilical bullae and ventrolateral clavi, with or without looped ribs between. The body chamber is smooth with a rounded venter.

Callihoplites is a member of the ammonitid family Hoplitidae and superfamily Hoplitoidea, now also known as the Hoplitoidea.

References

Ammonites of Europe
Hoplitidae
Ammonitida genera
Cretaceous ammonites
Albian life
Albian genus extinctions